Justin Olson (born 1979) is an American politician who served as a member of the Arizona Corporation Commission. Olson is a former member of the Arizona House of Representatives representing District 25 from January 14, 2013, until 2017. He is a member of the Republican Party.

Early life and education
Olson was born in Mesa, Arizona. He earned a Bachelor of Science degree and Master of Business Administration from Arizona State University.

Career 
Olson is a tax analyst who worked for the University of Phoenix. From 2011 to 2017, Olson served as a member of the Arizona House of Representatives, representing the 19th and 25th districts. On October 17, 2017, Governor Doug Ducey appointed Olson to fill a vacancy on the Arizona Corporation Commission.

In October 2021, Olson declared his candidacy for the 2022 United States Senate election in Arizona. He lost the Republican primary to Blake Masters.

Elections
 2016: Olson ran in the Republican primary for Arizona's 5th congressional district, losing to Andy Biggs.
 2014: Olson and Russell Bowers defeated Haydee Dawson, Michelle Udall and Jerry Walker in the Republican primary. Olson and Bowers defeated David Butler, Sheila Ogea, and Libertarian Michael Kielsky in the general election.
 2012: Redistricted to District 25, and with incumbent Republican Representatives Peggy Judd leaving the Legislature and David Stevens redistricted to District 14, Olson and Justin Pierce were unopposed in the August 28, 2012 Republican Primary; Pierce placed first, and Olson placed second with 18,392 votes; Pierce and Olson won the three-way November 6, 2012 General election, with Pierce taking the first seat and Olson taking the second seat with 48,335 votes against Democratic nominee David Butler.
 2010: When incumbent Republican Representative Rich Crandall ran for Arizona Senate and left a District 19 seat open, Olson ran alongside incumbent Representative Kirk Adams in the three-way August 24, 2010 Republican Primary, placing first with 12,386 votes; in the three-way November 2, 2010 General election, Adams took the first seat, and Olson took the second seat with 31,583 votes against Democratic nominee Kit Filbey.

References

External links
 Official page at the Arizona State Legislature
 Campaign site
 

1958 births
21st-century American politicians
Arizona State University alumni
Candidates in the 2016 United States elections
Candidates in the 2022 United States Senate elections
Living people
Republican Party members of the Arizona House of Representatives
Politicians from Mesa, Arizona
W. P. Carey School of Business alumni